Go Goa Gone is a 2013 Indian Hindi-language zombie action comedy film directed by Raj and D.K. The film features Saif Ali Khan, Kunal Khemu, Vir Das, Anand Tiwari and Puja Gupta. It was released on 10 May 2013. Almost one third of the film was shot in Mauritius. It is the first Indian zombie film. 
Go Goa Gone was successful at the box office. It received mixed reviews, but it received praise for its pacing, editing and use of zombies, though the screenplay and the second act received criticism. A sequel titled Go Goa Gone 2 is set for a release by 2023.

Plot 

Hardik and Luv are two young men, living with their roommate/friend Bunny. After Hardik loses his job and Luv gets dumped by his girlfriend, both decide to tag along with Bunny to Goa to relax. In Goa, Luv falls for Luna, and she invites the guys to a rave party, organized by the Russian mafia, which is being held on a secluded island. None of the friends tried the new drug as it's very expensive. The next morning, the three roommates find that the island has been infected by zombies, tried run to their boat but Luv insisted all to check for Luna in the hilltop villa. The villa got blood strains from zombie attack but found Luna in hiding. She told them about her friend feeling sick turned into a zombie and attacked her other friend while she locked herself scared. The three save Luna from her villa and stay together in hopes of surviving. When her friends turned zombies attacked them on their way, a Russian mafioso, Boris and his associate arrives and reveals himself as a zombie slayer.

Boris, his partner Nikolai, the three boys, and Luna plan to use the boat they had used to travel to the island to escape from it. Boris and Nikolai gave their guns on a condition, not to waste bullets, to Luv and Hardik on their insist but they wasted all bullets on a single zombie, which Boris had to take down. 

On their way, when a bunch get in their way, Luna and the three climbed a tree and Boris and Nikolai hid in bushed to escape but Bunny fell which a zombie noticed. When it attacked Bunny, Boris take it down with a knife. Boris said it was the new drug, D2RF, for which the party was conducted for as a launching ceremony, was responsible and it's a part of brain is alive, rest is technically dead of those who take it. He even told they are getting high with human blood and when their hunger grew it become even worse.

Finally, after escaping the forest, they discover that the mainland has also been infested by the zombies, forcing them to find another way to survive. Boris tells them the boat will come back to the original place due to the cyclic nature of water currents. However, the boat has been taken by a zombie. They find a home vacant and decide to stay there. Found some fruits in fridge, they had that that night. Boris doubted Hardik to be infected from his infected Russian girlfriend, tried killing but rest three defended him and Boris ask them to keep a eye on him. Boris leaves the four of them in the house, saying he has important work with Nikolai. 

At night after Boris leaves, the zombies find the house and attack the four of them. Luv's idea of playing like a zombie failed and they had to be on a run. They run away from the zombies and reach the rave party area, looking for food. There, too, they are attacked by zombies. Bunny gets trapped in a tent and is killed by zombies. The three manage to escape with the help of Boris and Nikolai: who arrive just in time. On the way, Nicolai gets bitten by a zombie, so he stays behind in the forest. The four are grief-stricken.

Luna realizes Boris had gone back to obtain his expensive cocaine. Whilst waiting for the boat to arrive, Hardik gets a call from Bunny saying he's alive and on top of a tower. The four of them go to rescue him, where Boris is surrounded by the zombies, and the four youngsters escape.

When they reach Boris's jeep, Bunny tells them that he threw cocaine at the zombies which were coming to attack him. The mixing of the red pill and cocaine made them still. They go back to save Boris, and throw the cocaine packets towards the sky and ask Boris to shoot them. This trick works, and all the zombies come to a standstill. Nut, he had to take down Nikolai with a rocket launcher when his shotgun. On the seaside, waiting for the boat, and when it arrives, Boris aim Adrina but Hardik asked not do it, and he tricked her zombie to get down of the boat as they could escape.    

They leave the island coming to the conclusion that drugs ruin one's life.

When they arrive at the shores of Goa, they see that the settlement is burning and everything is damaged. All five take their guns out, and the movie ends there on the note – "The End..is near", signaling a zombie apocalypse.

Cast

Production

Development 
For his role in the film as Russian mafioso turned zombie hunter, Boris, Saif Ali Khan who had no experience of portraying such a character, was given the book The Zombie Survival Guide by the directors as Khan was the first choice. Kunal Khemu was associated with the film writing, and it was his idea to get Saif Ali Khan on board.

The initial idea for the film was to make a crime comedy genre film, but then a zombie comedy was eventually finalised.

Promotion 
The film was publicised as India's first "Zom-Com".

The Volkswagen Polo used in the film was selected from a car audition named "My Car Superstar!" in association with Volkswagen India.

Soundtrack 

The music was composed by the duo Sachin–Jigar. The lyrics were written by Priya Panchal and Amitabh Bhattacharya, and songs feature the voices of Jigar Saraiya, Talia Bentson, Sachin Sanghvi, Priya Panchal, and Shreya Ghoshal.

Critical reception 
The film received mixed reviews from critics and has gathered a cult status in horror comedy.

Piyasree Dasgupta of Firstpost noted that "Go Goa Gone works in a manner similar to why Delhi Belly did" commending it for its "superb pace" and "smart editing". Lisa Tsering of The Hollywood Reporter stated that "the film starts out promisingly" calling its soundtrack "infectious" while also criticising its screenplay for "fizzling out halfway through".

Taran Adarsh of Bollywood Hungama gave the movie 3.5/5 stars and stated that "On the whole, GO GOA GONE is experimental since something like this has never been attempted earlier. But it's fun, witty, amusing and yes, thoroughly entertaining". Meena Iyer of Times of India gave it 3 out of 5 stars and said "Go Goa Gone is positively different from anything you have seen before. And for the young and restless or even those who like whacked-out fun, it's a great ride.". Namrata Joshi of Outlook rated the film 3 out of 5 stars and summarised by saying "It's fun, sharp, smart and irreverent. Go Goa Gone pushes many of our sanctimonious envelopes."

Rajeev Masand gave the film a 3/5 rating and wrote, "So much in this film is good, until it all goes nowhere in the end."

Shubir Rishi of Rediff.com gave it 2.5/5 stars and said: "Go Goa Gone" is a fun watch. There are plenty of innocent-sounding, slow-exploding one-liners, which are funny". Anupama Chopra of Hindustan Times gave it 2.5 out of 5 stars stating that, "The problem with Go Goa Gone is too much cleverness and not enough plot. Shubhra Gupta The Indian Express rated the film 2.5 out of 5 stars and wrote, "The film would have been funnier if the second act hadn't gone into a slide. And also if Khan hadn't played Boris so straight."

Sequel 
Shooting for Go Goa Gone 2 was to start in January 2019 but was pushed to September 2020 due to actors’ unavailability of dates. The first look poster of the film was released by Maddock Films on 15 January 2020 on their social media handles with a release date of March 2021. The film shoot was delayed due to the COVID-19 pandemic in 2020. The sequel will see Saif Ali Khan, Kunal Khemu, Vir Das, Anand Tiwari and Puja Gupta reprising their roles. The film is expected to be continued from where it left off.

References

External links 

 
 

2010s Hindi-language films
2013 action comedy films
2013 comedy horror films
2010s buddy films
2013 films
Films about drugs
Films set in Goa
Films set on beaches
Films shot in Mauritius
Indian action comedy films
Indian comedy horror films
Indian buddy films
Indian action horror films
Zombie comedy films
Stoner films
2013 comedy films
Films directed by Raj Nidimoru and Krishna D.K.
Human-zombie romance in fiction
Indian zombie films